Sankaranarayana Iyen was the Diwan of Travancore from 1815 to 1816. He was replaced in 1816 as he was considered incompetent.

References

Diwans of Travancore
19th-century Indian people
Year of birth missing